Juan Ferrara (born Juan Félix Gutiérrez Puerta; November 8, 1943) is a Mexican actor.

Family 
Juan is a son of Ofelia Guilmáin and brother of Lucía Guilmáin y Esther Guilmáin. He was once married to the Mexican actress, Helena Rojo. He has two sons, actors Juan Carlos Bonet and Mauricio Bonet, with his first wife, Alicia Bonet.

Biography
Ferrara demonstrated an interest in acting since he was a young child. But it wasn't until he was 22 that he booked his first job as an actor. He changed his name to Juan Ferrara before playing a small role in the 1965 movie, "Tajimara". In 1966, he got his first major movie role, as Sonny in Los Angeles de Puebla. Ferrara by then had graduated from Televisa's renowned acting school, and producers decided to cast him as a star in his own telenovela, El Espejismo Brillaba. The novela became a hit across Mexico and Latin America.

In 1970, he starred in two successful novelas, Yesenia and La Gata. In 1978, Ferrara was in Viviana, another extremely successful novela. He portrayed Julio Montesinos. In 1982 Ferrara then went on to star in Gabriel y Gabriela, though it was not as successful as his previous ventures.

1983 proved to be an important career year for Ferrara, as he established himself as an actor in Puerto Rico as well. Hired by Canal 2, he filmed Laura Guzman, Culpable!, a soap opera that became one of Puerto Rico's most seen television programs ever. Due to the novela's overwhelming popularity in Puerto Rico, the network decided to bring Ferrara back in 1985, to film a telenovela called Tanairi. Ferrara starred alongside Von Marie Mendez in this soap opera.

Television

Awards and nominations

Films 

Tajimara (1965)
Tirando a Gol (1965) (Trying to Score)
La Muerte es Puntual (1965) (Death is Always on Time)
La Valentina (1966)
Los Angeles de Puebla  (1966) (Puebla's Angels) as Sonny
Pedro Paramo  (1967) (as Florencio)
Esclava del Deseo (1968) (Slave of Desire)
No hay Cruces en el Mar (1968) (There are no Crosses at Sea)
Corona de Lagrimas, (1968) Crown of Tears
5 de chocolate y 1 de fresa) (1968) (5 Chocolate ones and a Strawberry One)
El Club de los Suicidas (1968) (The Suicidal Ones Club)
Los Problemas de Mama (1970) (Mom's Problems)
Mision Cumplida (1970) (Mission Accomplished)
La montaña sagrada (1973) (The Holy Mountain)
El Manantial del Molagro (1974) (Miracle Falls)
Ven Conmigo (1975) (Come With Me) as Guillermo
 De Todos Modos, Juan te Llamas! (1978) (Your Name is Still Juan!)
Noche de Juerga (1979) (Party Night)
Misterio (1980)
Dos y Dos, Cinco (1980) (Two Plus Two:Five)
Mentiras (1986) (Lies) as Alvaro Ibanez
Fuera de la ley (1998) 
Cuando las cosas suceden (2007) as De La Rosa

References

External links
almalatina.net's page on Ferrara

1943 births
Best Actor Ariel Award winners
Living people
Mexican male film actors
Mexican male telenovela actors
Mexican people of Spanish descent